Yalwa is a worldwide business directory where companies can list their business and advertise within their local neighborhood. The Yalwa Business Directory is available in over 50 countries worldwide, covering 5 major languages.

Klaus P. Gapp is the CEO and founder of Yalwa.

Overview 

At the Yalwa business directory, small business owners can list their company. Yalwa has a thousand different categories to specify what kind of products or services the listed businesses offer.

Background 

The Yalwa business directory is operated by the German company Yalwa located in Wiesbaden, Germany. Yalwa was launched in June 2007 with 12 English speaking countries. Within the following year, Yalwa was launched in 16 further countries, covering the languages Spanish, German, Dutch, and French. With the launch of 10 additional countries in December 2009, Yalwa was made available in 38 countries worldwide and in 5 languages. By 2014, Yalwa had expanded into over 50 countries worldwide.

References 

 Yalwa Press Release Retrieved 28 Dez 2010
 Your-Story.org Retrieved 02 Jan 2011
 Press Release on Yalwa Expansion Retrieved 02 Jan 2011
 B2B Online Magazine, Online business directories: an important SMB investment Retrieved 07 Jan 2011
 Review on Killerstartups.com Retrieved 28 Dez 2010
 Yalwa on Startupwiki (in German) Retrieved 28 Dez 2010
 Article on deutsche-startups.de (in German) Retrieved 07 Jan 2010
 Article from 28 Dez 2012 on Wiesbadener Kurier (in German) Retrieved 01 Jan 2013

External links 

Yalwa homepage: http://www.yalwa.info/
Yalwa Blog: http://www.yalwa.info/local_business/blog/ 
 Interview with founder Klaus P. Gapp (in German)
 עסקים פתוחים בשבת

Online companies of Germany
Directories